The private sector is the part of the economy, sometimes referred to as the citizen sector, which is owned by private groups, usually as a means of establishment for profit or non profit, rather than being owned by the government.

Employment
The private sector employs most of the workforce in some countries. In private sector, activities are guided by the motive to earn money.

A 2013 study by the International Finance Corporation (part of the World Bank Group) identified that 90 percent of jobs in developing countries are in the private sector.

Diversification
In free enterprise countries, such as the United States, the private sector is wider, and the state places fewer constraints on firms. In countries with more government authority, such as China, the public sector makes up most of the economy.

Regulation 
States legally regulate the private sector. Businesses operating within a country must comply with the laws in that country. In some cases, usually involving multinational corporations that can pick and choose their suppliers and locations based on their perception of the regulatory environment, local state regulations have resulted in uneven practices within one company. For example, workers in one country may benefit from strong labour unions, while workers in another country have very weak laws supporting labour unions, even though they work for the same employer. In some cases, industries and individual businesses choose to self-regulate by applying higher standards for dealing with their workers, customers, or the environment than the minimum that is legally required of them.

There can be negative effects from the private sector. In the early 1980s, the Corrections Corporation of America pioneered the idea of running prisons for a profit. Today, corporate-run prisons hold eight percent of America's inmates. Since it is from the private sector, their main priority isn't rehabilitation, but profit. This has resulted in many human rights violations across the United States.

See also

 Company law
 Free enterprise
 Private enterprise
 Private law
 Public economics
 Public sector
 Three-sector model

References

 
Economic sectors
Capitalism